Vincenzo Serpico (born 21 June 1991) is an Italian lightweight rower. He won a gold medal at the 2013 World Rowing Championships in Chungju with the lightweight men's eight.

Achievements

References

External links
 

1991 births
Living people
Italian male rowers
World Rowing Championships medalists for Italy
Rowers of Fiamme Oro